Lois Marie Gibbs (born June 25, 1951) is an American environmental activist. As a primary organizer of the Love Canal Homeowners Association, Lois Gibbs brought wide public attention to the environmental crisis in Love Canal. Her actions resulted in the evacuation of over 800 families. She founded the non-profit Clearinghouse for Hazardous Waste in 1981 to help train and support local activists with their environmental work. She continues to work with the organization, renamed the Center for Health, Environment, and Justice (CHEJ).

Early life 
Lois Marie Gibbs was born in a blue-collar area of Grand Island, New York. She had five siblings that she grew up with; her father worked in steel mills and her mother was a housewife. Gibbs did not have many hobbies and activities as a child. After she graduated high school, she married Harry Gibbs, a chemical worker. She had two children and moved to Love Canal.

Activism 
Lois Gibbs's involvement in environmental causes began in 1978, when she discovered that her 5-year-old son's elementary school in Niagara Falls, New York was built on a toxic waste dump. She approached the School Board after worrying about the safety of her child, and they refused to take any action. Gibbs began speaking with other parents and in 1978, she started the Love Canal Parents Movement.  After the creation of this movement, the New York State Department of Health stated that the school should be closed and that pregnant women and children living on these residences should leave. The state then purchased homes close to the canal, which led to the Love Canal Homeowners Association (LCHA).

Gibbs created a petition and reached out to the residents of her neighborhood by going door-to-door to gather support. Gibbs's efforts were centered on her role as a mother fighting to protect her children's health. She led her community in a battle against the local, state, and federal governments by presenting the signatures to the New York State Department of Health.

After years of struggle, 833 families were eventually evacuated, and the cleanup of Love Canal began. National press coverage made Lois Gibbs a household name. In addition, President Jimmy Carter mentioned Gibbs as the key grassroots leader in the Love Canal movement during 1980. Her efforts also led to the creation of the U.S. Environmental Protection Agency's Comprehensive Environmental Response, Compensation and Liability Act, or Superfund, which is used to locate and clean up toxic waste sites throughout the United States.

In 1980, Gibbs formed the Citizens' Clearinghouse for Hazardous Waste, later renamed the Center for Health, Environment and Justice (CHEJ) in 1998, where she currently serves as executive director. CHEJ is a grassroots environmental crisis center that provides information, resources, technical assistance and training to community groups around the nation. CHEJ seeks to form strong local organizations in order to protect neighborhoods from exposure to hazardous wastes.

Gibbs has authored several books about the Love Canal story and the effects of toxic waste. The earlier and most quoted is Love Canal. My story, written with Murray Levine and published in 1982. Her story was dramatized in the 1982 made-for-TV movie Lois Gibbs: the Love Canal Story, in which she was played by Marsha Mason.

Later life 
Lois Gibbs is still in partnership with the Center for Health, Environment and Justice (CHEJ). She has moved her point of activism to fracking, which she has published articles in The Huffington Post about. She bases the value of this article on putting families and earth first. She is currently working with a group in Pennsylvania in order to gain more support on keeping the ground and water clean.

Awards

 Received the 1990 Goldman Environmental Prize
 The 5th Annual Heinz Award in the Environment (1998)
 John Gardner Leadership Award from Independent Sector (1999)
 Nominated for a Nobel Peace Prize in 2003
 Awarded an honorary degree from Haverford College for her work as an environmental activist (2006)
 Received an honorary degree, a doctor of humane letters, from Green Mountain College (2009)
 Received an honorary degree, a doctor of Laws from Medaille College (2010)
 Received an honorary degree, a doctor of Public Service, from Tufts University (2013)

Gallery

References

External links
 Center for Health, Environment & Justice website
 Lois Gibbs Personal
 1982 film info, Lois Gibbs and Love Canal

Library resources
 Lois Gibbs Love Canal Papers, 1951-2010 Tufts University

1951 births
Living people
American environmentalists
Love Canal
Goldman Environmental Prize awardees